A pension fund, also known as a superannuation fund in some countries, is any plan, fund, or scheme which provides retirement income.

Pension funds typically have large amounts of money to invest and are the major investors in listed and private companies.  They are especially important to the stock market where large institutional investors dominate.  The largest 300 pension funds collectively hold about USD$6 trillion in assets.  In 2012, PricewaterhouseCoopers estimated that pension funds worldwide hold over $33.9 trillion in assets (and were expected to grow to more than $56 trillion by 2020), the largest for any category of institutional investor ahead of mutual funds, insurance companies, currency reserves, sovereign wealth funds, hedge funds, or private equity.

The Federal Old-age and Survivors Insurance Trust Fund in the United States, which oversees $2.66 trillion in assets, is the world's largest public pension fund.

Classifications

Open vs. closed pension fund
Open pension funds support at least one pension plan with no restriction on membership while closed pension funds support only pension plans that are limited to certain employees.

Closed pension funds are further subclassified into:
Single employer pension funds
Multi-employer pension funds
Related member pension funds
Individual pension funds

Public vs. private pension funds
A public pension fund is one that is regulated under public sector law while a private pension fund is regulated under private sector law.

In certain countries, the distinction between public or government pension funds and private pension funds may be difficult to assess. In others, the distinction is made sharply in law, with very specific requirements for administration and investment.  For example, local governmental bodies in the United States are subject to laws passed by the states in which those localities exist, and these laws include provisions such as defining classes of permitted investments and a minimum municipal obligation.

Largest pension funds 
The following table lists largest pension funds by total assets by the SWF Institute.

By country

Australia

Government
 Commonwealth Superannuation Scheme (old scheme for federal civil servants)
 Military Superannuation and Benefits Scheme (current scheme for Australian Defence Force personnel)
 Public Sector Superannuation accumulation plan (current scheme for federal civil servants)
 Public Sector Superannuation Scheme (old scheme for federal civil servants)
 State Super (for New South Wales state civil servants)

Industry (not-for-profit)

 AustralianSuper
 AustSafe Super
 CareSuper
 Cbus
 Energy Super
 FIRSTSUPER
 HESTA
 Hostplus
 legalsuper
 LUCRF Super
 Media Super
 MTAA Super (Spirit Super)
 NGS Super
 REI Super
 TWUSUPER
 UniSuper
 Retail Employees Superannuation Trust

Private
 ANZ Australian Staff Superannuation Scheme (for employees of ANZ Bank)

Brazil

 Aceprev
 Baneses
 Banesprev
 Centrus
 FAPES
 Forluz
 Funcef
 Fundação Banrisul
 Fundação CESP
 Fundação Itaubanco
 Petros
 PREVI - Caixa de Previdência dos Funcionários do Banco do Brasil (the closed private pension fund for employees of the Brazilian federal government-owned bank)
 Sistel
 Valia

Canada

Government
 Alberta Investment Management Corporation
 Alberta Pensions Services Corporation
 British Columbia Investment Management Corporation (BCIMC) 455
 Caisse de dépôt et placement du Québec
 Canada Pension Plan (investments directed by the Canada Pension Plan Investment Board)
 Healthcare of Ontario Pension Plan (HOOPP)
 Ontario Teachers Pension Plan
 Ontario Municipal Employees Retirement System
 Public Sector Pension Investment Board (PSP Investments)
 OPSEU Pension Trust (OPTrust)
 Ontario Pension Board (OPB)
 TTC Pension Plan (TTCPP)
 University Pension Plan (UPP)

Private
 Colleges of Applied Arts and Technology Pension Plan (CAAT)
 Boilermakers Pension Fund Trust
 Labourers' Pension Fund of Central and Eastern Canada (LIUNA)
 Teamsters Canadian Pension Plan
 Telecommunication Workers Pension Plan
 UFCW Canadian Pension Plan

Chile
 AFP Modelo
 Chile pension system

China
  – managed by National Council for Social Security Fund

Greece

Government
 Public Employees Pension Fund

Private
 TAPILTAT, the Fund for Mutual Assistance of the Employees of Ioniki Bank and Other Banks, the multi-employer auxiliary pension fund

Hong Kong
 Mandatory Provident Fund Scheme (MPF Schemes)
 Occupational Retirement Schemes (ORSO Schemes)

India
 Employees' Provident Fund Organisation – a statutory social security body of the Government of India that administers a mandatory Provident Fund Scheme, Pension Scheme and a death/disability Insurance Scheme. Provident Fund is applicable for employees across all establishments (private as well as government, subject to criteria). EPFO is the largest social security organisation in India with assets well over  5 lakh crore (US$159 billion) as of 2014.
 National Pension Scheme – a defined-contribution–based pension scheme launched by the Government of India open to all citizens of India on a voluntary basis and mandatory for the employees of central government (except Indian Armed Forces) who are appointed on or after 1 January 2004. Indian citizens between the age of 18 and 70 are eligible to join.

Japan
See Japan Pension Service
 Government Pension Investment Fund, Japan (GPIF, 年金積立金管理運用独立行政法人)

Malaysia
 Employees Provident Fund (Malaysia's largest, total assets of around RM407 billion in diversified portfolio)

Morocco
 Caisse de dépôt et de gestion 
 CMR

Nepal
 Employees Provident Fund Nepal

Netherlands
 Stichting Pensioenfonds ABP (ABP)
 Stichting Pensioenfonds Zorg en Welzijn (PFZW, formerly PGGM)

Norway
 The Government Pension Fund - Global (Statens pensjonsfond - Utland)
 The Government Pension Fund - Norway (Statens pensjonsfond - Norge)

Romania
The pension system in Romania is made of three pillars. One is the state pension (Pillar I – Mandatory), the second is a private mandatory pension where the state transfers a percentage of the contribution it collects for the public pension, and the third is an optional private pension (Pillar III – Voluntary).

The Financial Supervisory Authority – Private Pension is responsible for the supervision and regulation of the private pension system.

Saudi Arabia
 Public Pension Agency (PPA)
 General Organization for Social Insurance

Serbia
The pension system in Serbia is made of three pillars. One is the state pension (Pillar I – Mandatory), where every insured person is obliged to pay contributions from their paycheck, the second is a voluntary state pension, where an uninsured person is voluntarily included in state pension system, and the third is an optional private pension (Pillar III – Voluntary).
Pension and disability insurance fund

Singapore
 Central Provident Fund

Switzerland
 Pension system in Switzerland

Turkey

Government
 Sosyal Güvenlik Kurumu (Social Security Institution, SGK)

Social Security Institution was established by the Social Security Institution Law No:5502 which was published in the Official Gazette No: 26173 dated 20.06.2006 and brings the Social Insurance Institution, General Directorate of Bağ-kur and General Directorate of Emekli Sandığı whose historical development are summarized above under a single roof in order to transfer five different retirement regimes which are civil servants, contractual paid workers, agricultural paid workers, self-employers and agricultural self-employers into a single retirement regime that will offer equal actuarial rights and obligations.

Private
 Armed Forces Pension Fund 
OYAK (Ordu Yardımlaşma Kurumu/Armed Forces Pension Fund) provides its members with "supplementary retirement benefits" apart from the official retirement fund, T.C.Emekli Sandığı/SSK, to which they are primarily affiliated.

In addition to the retirement benefit, OYAK pays "disability benefits" to the members on duty when they become partially or fully disabled as well as "death benefits" to the heirs of the deceased member if the death occurs during the member's subscription to the foundation.

OYAK is incorporated as a private entity under its own law subject to Turkish civic and commercial codes. OYAK, while fulfilling its legal duties, as set in the law, also provides its members with social services such as loans, home loans and retirement income systems.

The initial source of OYAK's funds is a compulsory 10 percent levy on the base salary of Turkey's 200,000 serving officers who, together with 25,000 current pensioners, make up OYAK's members.

Some other Turkish private pension funds:

 YAPI ve KREDİ BANKASI A.Ş. Mensupları Yardım ve Emekli Sandığı Vakfı
 AKBANK T.A.Ş. Mensupları Tekaüt Sandığı Vakfı
 TÜRKİYE GARANTİ BANKASI A.Ş. Memur ve Müstahdemleri Emekli ve Yardım Sandığı Vakfı
 TÜRKİYE ODALAR BORSALAR VE BİRLİK PERSONELİ SİGORTA VE EMEKLİ SANDIĞI VAKFI
 TÜRKİYE İŞ BANKASI A.Ş. Mensupları Emekli Sandığı Vakfı

United States
In the United States, pension funds include schemes which result in a deferral of income by employees, even if retirement income provision is not the intent. The United States has $19.1 trillion in retirement and pension assets ($9.1 trillion in private funds, $10 trillion in public funds) as of 31 December 2016. The largest 200 pension funds accounted for $4.540 trillion as of 30 September 2009.

Government

See also
Global assets under management
Pension buyout
Pension insurance contract
Pension regulation
Qualifying registered overseas pension schemes
Sovereign wealth fund

References

Pensions
Pension funds

az:Pensiya fondu
he:קרן פנסיה